"Don't Cry Out Loud" is a song written in 1976 by Peter Allen with lyricist Carole Bayer Sager that is best known as a hit single for Melissa Manchester in the US and for Elkie Brooks in the UK.

Background and first recordings
Ann-Margret, who was a friend of Peter Allen, has stated that the song's lyrics—though written by Carole Bayer Sager—reflect Allen's own frame of mind: "He just kept everything inside...his personal philosophy was 'Don't show anyone you're crying'." Bernadette Peters, who toured with Allen in 1989, has stated that Allen told her that "his mother taught him to always put your best face on" in response to Allen's father dying by suicide when Allen was 14 years old. The references to "baby" in the song refer to Allen's younger sister.

The first evident recording of the song is by The Moments as "We Don't Cry Out Loud", track-produced by Sylvia Robinson, and given a December 1976 release simultaneous with its parent album Moments With You. "We Don't Cry Out Loud" was the second of three consecutive single releases by the Moments, which were co-written by Carole Bayer Sager. The first and third of these singles: "With You" and "I Don't Wanna Go" were both Top 20 R&B hits but "We Don't Cry Out Loud" rose no higher than number 79 on the chart.

Peter Allen himself included a version of the song on his 1977 live album It is Time for Peter Allen, with the track having a December 1977 single release. Allen's studio recording of his song was introduced on his 1979 album release I Could Have Been a Sailor. Allen also included "Don't Cry Out Loud" on the 1985 live album Captured Live at Carnegie Hall.

Melissa Manchester version
According to Arista Records president Clive Davis, Melissa Manchester recorded "Don't Cry Out Loud" at his strong suggestion as Davis felt that Manchester's intended 1979 album release lacked a potential Top 40 comeback hit. Davis assigned production of the track to Harry Maslin, who had co-produced the David Bowie albums Young Americans and Station to Station and whose most recent production work had been with Arista's Bay City Rollers. Although Manchester herself regularly collaborated with lyricist Carole Bayer Sager—their output including Manchester's sole (to that point) Top Ten hit "Midnight Blue"—Harry Maslin recalled that Manchester "hated the song 'Don't Cry Out Loud' and was angry with me for doing it [i.e. producing Manchester's recording]"; "I think that's why I got such a wonderful vocal out of her".

In a 2015 interview Manchester stated: "[Clive Davis] remembers history his way and I remember history my way. He remembers bringing me 'Don’t Cry Out Loud'. I remember being friends with Peter Allen and Carole Bayer Sager and hearing 'Don’t Cry Out Loud' as a very quiet song, bringing it to him and saying yes, it's gorgeous, let's do it the way Peter did it—as beautiful and quiet. [Then] I showed up in the studio and the cannons blew on this huge version—which turned out beautifully, it turned out as a gift." Manchester conceded reservations about the song's theme, saying in 2004: "I finally understand what it meant...I [originally] thought it was a brilliant song but it seemed like the antithesis of everything Carole [Bayer Sager] and I were writing which was always about self-affirmation and crying out and sharpening your communication skills. But it's a beautifully crafted song that was all about how in the end you just have to learn to cope—and that's no easy thing."

Recorded at Allen Zentz Studios Hollywood, "Don't Cry Out Loud" was released 11 October 1978 and did indeed reach the Top 40 at the end of 1978, rising to a number 10 peak on the Billboard Hot 100 twenty weeks later in March 1979. The single also reached number 9 on the Adult Contemporary chart, and thanks to its long chart life on the Hot 100, was ranked as Billboard′s 26th biggest hit of 1979, ranking ahead of a number of songs that reached higher (but shorter) peaks on the weekly surveys (including Sister Sledge's "We Are Family" and the Bee Gees' number-one hit "Love You Inside Out").

Personnel
 Melissa Manchester – lead vocals
 Bill Payne – acoustic piano
 Lee Ritenour – guitar
 Dennis Budimir – guitar
 David Hungate – bass
 Jim Keltner – drums
 Barry Fasman – arrangements
 Harry Bluestone – concertmaster
 Frank DeCaro – conductor

Chart performance

Weekly charts

Year-end charts

Later uses
This version has been lip-synced to comic effect; once in Drop Dead Gorgeous, a 1999 dark comedy, and more recently in a May 2013 episode of Late Night with Jimmy Fallon, as part of a "Lip-Sync Off" with John Krasinski.

It was also featured (lip synced) in the BBC comedy Beautiful People and in one episode of CBC's Schitt's Creek.

The song was interloped with the 4 Non Blondes song, "What's Up?", in a 2005 viral video called, "Fabulous Secret Powers".

Elkie Brooks version
Elkie Brooks released a version of the song for the UK market with Gus Dudgeon producing. Brooks' "Don't Cry Out Loud" reached its number 12 peak on the UK Top 50 dated 16 December 1978—two weeks before Manchester's version reached the US Top 40— and was also a hit in Ireland (number 14). Brooks' "Don't Cry Out Loud" was not featured on its singer's 1979 album release Live and Learn instead making a belated debut as an album track on Brook's all time bestseller Pearls released in 1981. The song later served as the title track for Brooks' 2005 live album release cut in 2004. In 2009 Brooks stated: "Many years ago I was persuaded to do a lot of songs I wasn't particularly keen on. 'Don't Cry Out Loud' was one of them—but over the years I have [grown] to like it!"

Personnel
Elkie Brooks – vocals
Tim Hinkley – piano/keyboards
Jerry Friedmen, Eric Weissberg, Geoff Whitehorn – guitars
Jeremy Meek – bass guitar
Graham Jarvis – drums
Bruce Baxter – arrangement

Other versions

Rita Coolidge's performance of "Don't Cry Out Loud" took the Grand Prize at the Tokyo Music Festival held on June 17, 1979, with Coolidge's album featuring the track and named for it becoming a Top 20 Japanese bestseller that summer.

"Don't Cry Out Loud" was recorded by American Idol Season 3 runner-up Diana DeGarmo for inclusion on her 2004 single release helmed by the track "Dreams"; Clive Davis selected "Don't Cry Out Loud" for DeGarmo to sing and Melissa Manchester attended DeGarmo's recording session giving DeGarmo pointers on how to sing the song.

Liza Minnelli—Peter Allen's ex-wife—sings "Don't Cry Out Loud" on her 2002 album Liza's Back, which was recorded from a seven-night engagement at the Beacon Theatre in New York City that June. Minnelli sets the song in a sequence of "crying" songs with "Don't Cry Out Loud" performed between "Cry" and "Crying": Minnelli's rendition features only the first verse of "Don't Cry Out Loud" and amends the lyrics of the chorus to invert their original import ("Cry out loud, don't keep it inside. Don't learn how to hide your feelings.")

The song has also been recorded by the Airmen of Note (instrumental), Rachelle Ann Go, Shirley Bassey, Anita Dobson, Engelbert Humperdinck, Jal Joshua, Joe Longthorne ("We Don't Cry Out Loud"), Sandra Reemer, and Shirley Zwerus (nl). It was also covered notably by actor and singer John Barrowman. In the Peter Allen stage bio-jukebox musical The Boy from Oz, the character of Allen's mother Marion Woolnough sings "Don't Cry Out Loud" to Allen after his father commits suicide—as in reality Woolnough reportedly did respond to the death of Allen's father by advising Allen to "always put your best face on." Beth Fowler is featured on the track on the 2003 original Broadway cast recording. The song is also implemented into the Broadway musical Disaster!, a spoof of 70s music and disaster films.

Miss America 1980 Cheryl Prewitt—Miss Mississippi 1979—sang "Don't Cry Out Loud" to her own piano accompaniment in the talent competition of the Miss America Pageant broadcast on NBC 9 September 1979 from Convention Hall in Atlantic City.

Kerry Ellis sang "Don't Cry Out Loud" at her own special Friday Night is Music Night in April 2012.

The song was performed by Juno Temple and Jeremy Dozier in the film Dirty Girl.

An excerpt of "Don't Cry Out Loud" is performed by Jane Krakowski in the role of Jenna Maroney in a 2009 episode of the NBC-TV series 30 Rock entitled "The Ones".

The song was featured in a second season episode of the Canadian television comedy series Schitt's Creek.

The song was performed by Go featured in Korean Drama Lie After Lie aired on GMA Network.

References

1978 singles
The Moments songs
Melissa Manchester songs
Elkie Brooks songs
Liza Minnelli songs
Songs written by Carole Bayer Sager
Songs written by Peter Allen (musician)
Song recordings produced by Harry Maslin
1976 songs
Arista Records singles
A&M Records singles
RCA Records singles